Grady Allen Brown, (born May 1, 1944), is a former Democratic member of the South Carolina House of Representatives, representing the 50th District from 1984 until 2017.

Brown graduated from Ashville Central High School and later attended trade school to become a barber. He is a former president of the Lee County Chamber of Commerce, from which he served from 1974 to 1975.

Brown served with the South Carolina Air National Guard for 6 years.

References

External links
Project Vote Smart - Rep. Grady Brown's profile

1944 births
Living people
South Carolina Democrats
21st-century American politicians
People from Bishopville, South Carolina